Na A-reum (born 24 March 1990) is a South Korean track and road bicycle racer, born in Naju, who last rode for UCI Women's Team . She competed at the 2012 Summer Olympics in the Women's road race, finishing 13th. She also competed in the road race at the 2016 Olympics. In 2018 Na won the South Korea National Championships road race and individual time trial.

Major results

Road

2008
 Asian Junior Road Championships
1st  Time trial
1st  Road race
2012
 1st  Time trial, Asian Road Championships
 2nd Tour of Zhoushan Island II
 3rd Road race, National Road Championships
 5th Overall Tour of Zhoushan Island I
2013
 1st  Road race, National Road Championships
2014
 1st  Time trial, Asian Games
 Asian Road Championships
1st  Time trial
9th Road race
 1st  Road race, National Road Championships
2015
 Asian Road Championships
1st  Time trial
7th Road race
2016
 1st  Road race, Asian Road Championships
 8th SwissEver GP Cham-Hagendorn
2017
 National Road Championships
1st  Road race
2nd Time trial
 2nd  Road race, Asian Road Championships
2018
 Asian Games
1st  Road race
1st  Time trial
 National Road Championships
1st  Road race
1st  Time trial
2019
 Asian Road Championships
1st  Team time trial
2nd  Road race
 7th Donostia San Sebastian Klasikoa
2020
 National Road Championships
1st  Road race
3rd Time trial

Track

2010
 Asian Track Championships
1st  Omnium
2nd  Individual pursuit
2nd  Team pursuit
2011
 Asian Track Championships
1st  Points race
2nd  Team pursuit
2014
 Asian Games
2nd  Team pursuit (with Lee Chaek-Yung, Lee Ju-mi, Lee Min-hye, Son Hee-jung, and Kim You-ri)
3rd  Omnium
 Asian Track Championships
2nd  Team pursuit (with Lee Ju-mi, Lee Min-hye, and Kim You-ri)
3rd  Individual pursuit
2016
 GP Velodromes Romands
1st Points race
1st Scratch
2018
 Asian Games
1st  Madison
1st  Team pursuit
2019
 Asian Track Championships
1st  Team pursuit
2nd  Madison

References

External links

1990 births
Living people
Olympic cyclists of South Korea
South Korean female cyclists
Cyclists at the 2012 Summer Olympics
Cyclists at the 2016 Summer Olympics
Cyclists at the 2020 Summer Olympics
Asian Games medalists in cycling
Cyclists at the 2010 Asian Games
Cyclists at the 2014 Asian Games
Cyclists at the 2018 Asian Games
Medalists at the 2014 Asian Games
Medalists at the 2018 Asian Games
Asian Games gold medalists for South Korea
Asian Games silver medalists for South Korea
Asian Games bronze medalists for South Korea
People from Naju
Sportspeople from South Jeolla Province